R72 may refer to:
 R72 (South Africa), a road
 , a destroyer of the Royal Navy
 R-72 Fürstenfeldbruck, a former United States Army Air Corps airfield in Germany
 Small nucleolar RNA R72